Chinedum Enyinnaya Orji  is the 11th and current Speaker of the Abia State House of Assembly, in office since June 10, 2019. He was elected as the Lawmaker representing Umuahia Central State Constituency in 2015 and got re-elected during the 2019 Governorship and State House of Assembly Elections in Abia State on the platform of the Peoples Democratic Party. He was unanimously elected as the Speaker of the Abia State House of Assembly on the 10th of June, 2019 during the Inauguration of the 7th Abia State House of Assembly.

Early life
Chinedum Enyinnaya Orji  was born on December 25, 1970, to the family of a renowned Civil Servant turned politician, Senator Theodore and Chief Mrs. Odochi Orji of Amaokwe in Ugba village, Ugba Autonomous Community in Umuahia North Local Government Area of Abia State, Nigeria. Chinedum attended Ugba Community Primary School, Umuahia Ibeku between 1976 and 1982, from where he proceeded to Government Secondary School, Owerri, between 1982 and 1987. He gained admission into the Federal University of Technology Owerri where he graduated with a bachelor's degree in Civil Engineering in 1996.

Professional career
Chinedum Enyinnaya Orji is a Member of the Nigerian Society of Engineers (MNSE), the umbrella organization for the Engineering Profession in Nigeria.

Political career
Before he threw his hat into the ring of politics, Rt Hon Chinedum E. Orji MNSE had carved a niche for himself as a philanthropist extraordinaire who touched the lives of the people through his numerous philanthropic interventions that saw to the execution of projects and donation of items that directly touched the lives of the people through his Direct Touch Initiative which also saw to the empowerment of many Abians particularly the youth and women through skills acquisition for which he has received many awards and commendations.

Having endeared himself to the people, it became easy for him to emerge as the Lawmaker representing Umuahia Central State Constituency at the Abia State House of Assembly at the 2015 general elections and served as Majority Leader of the House till 2019 when he was re-elected into the 7th Assembly. On June 10, 2019, Chinedum Enyinnaya Orji emerged as Speaker of the 7th Abia State House of Assembly making him the number three citizen of the State. He is a member of the People's Democratic Party.

Corruption allegations and EFCC investigation
In February 2020, the Economic and Financial Crimes Commission announced an investigation into Orji, his father Theodore, and his brother Ogbonna based on a petition the commission received in 2017. The petition, filed by the Fight Corruption: Save Nigeria Group, outlined over ₦500 billion in public funds that were allegedly stolen by the Orji family while Theodore served as Abia State Governor from 2007 to 2015. The money supposedly consisted of ₦383 billion from federal accounts, ₦55 billion in excess crude revenue, ₦2.3 billion from SURE-P funds, ₦1.8 billion from ecological funds, a ₦10.5 billion First Bank loan, a ₦4 billion Diamond Bank loan, a ₦12 billion Paris Club refund, a ₦2 billion agricultural loan for farmers, and ₦55 billion in Abia State Oil Producing Areas Development Commission funds along with other government money including a ₦500 million monthly security fund. Later in February 2020, both Theodore and Chinedu Orji were interrogated as the investigation found that Chinedu had around different suspicious 100 bank accounts that could have been used to hide the stolen money.

On August 19, 2021, Theodore was arrested at the Nnamdi Azikiwe International Airport after he failed to abide by his release conditions and forfeit his passport to the EFCC. Later that day, Chinedu turned himself in and was taken into custody. Both were interrogated before being released on bail and told to return for future questioning.

Sun Newspapers Public Service Award
On the 17th of October, Chinedum Enyinnaya Orji was honoured with The Sun Public Service Award 2020 award, by The Sun Publishing Ltd, publishers of The Daily Sun Newspapers for touching lives

Personal life
Chinedum Enyinnaya Orji is a Knight of the Anglican Communion.

References

1970 births
Living people
People from Abia State
Igbo politicians
Peoples Democratic Party state governors of Nigeria
Federal University of Technology Owerri alumni
Nigeria